Adolf von Arnim-Boitzenburg (born 12 December 1832 at Boitzenburg; died 15 December 1887 at Boitzenburg)  was a German landowner and politician for Free Conservative Party.

Life 
His parents were politician Adolf Heinrich von Arnim-Boitzenburg and Anna Caroline von der Schulenburg (1804–1886). His brother Traugott Hermann von Arnim-Boitzenburg (1839-1919) was a prussian diplomat. He studied German law at University of Göttingen in Göttingen and in Berlin. Since 1868 he was member of Prussian House of Lords. From 1874 to 1877 he was Oberpräsident of Province of Silesia. Arnim-Boitzenburg was from 1867 to 1884 member of German Reichstag. From 1880 to 1881 he was for a short time president of German Reichstag. He married Mathilde von Schweinitz und Krain (1841-1874). After the death of his first wife he married Helene von Schweinitz und Krayn (1846-1930).

External links 
 Reichstag Abgeordnetenbank: Graf von Arnim-Boitzenburg, Adolf

References 

1832 births
1887 deaths
German landowners
Prussian politicians
Free Conservative Party politicians
Members of the Prussian House of Lords
Members of the 1st Reichstag of the German Empire
Members of the 2nd Reichstag of the German Empire
Members of the 3rd Reichstag of the German Empire
Members of the 4th Reichstag of the German Empire
Members of the 5th Reichstag of the German Empire
Arnim family